World War Z is a 2006 apocalyptic horror novel by American author Max Brooks. 

World War Z may also refer to:

World War Z (film), a 2013 American apocalyptic action horror film
World War Z (2013 video game), a 2013 mobile game developed by Phosphor Games
World War Z (2019 video game), a PC and console game developed by Saber Interactive

See also
The War Z, a video game